Cardome Centre is a historic property located in Georgetown, Kentucky along the north fork of Elkhorn Creek. The  is owned by the Catholic Diocese of Lexington and currently houses St. John Catholic School. Previously the property was home to several famous people including Kentucky Governor James F. Robinson. More recently the site was the location of a girl's academy. It previously served as a community center for the city of Georgetown, but was purchased by the Catholic Diocese of Lexington in 2019.

History

The first structure was built by the Bradford family in 1821. James F. Robinson, who was governor of Kentucky during the American Civil War, made his home on the land. His home burned in 1987 and was torn down.

From 1896 to 1987, the Sisters of Visitation owned the property and had a prestigious girls' academy on the site.

Future plans include the building of a new chapel and relocation of St. John's parish to the Cardome property as a replacement for their existing downtown structure.

References

External links

SS. Francis and John Catholic Parish
Catholic Diocese of Lexington

Houses on the National Register of Historic Places in Kentucky
Houses completed in 1821
Buildings and structures in Georgetown, Kentucky
National Register of Historic Places in Scott County, Kentucky
Roman Catholic Diocese of Lexington
School buildings on the National Register of Historic Places in Kentucky
1821 establishments in Kentucky
Schools in Scott County, Kentucky
Catholic schools in Kentucky